is a Japanese professional footballer who plays as a goalkeeper for J.League club Júbilo Iwata.

Club statistics

References

External links
Profile at Júbilo Iwata

1991 births
Living people
People from Toyota, Aichi
Tokai Gakuen University alumni
Association football people from Aichi Prefecture
Japanese footballers
J1 League players
J2 League players
Shonan Bellmare players
Tokushima Vortis players
Yokohama F. Marinos players
Júbilo Iwata players
Association football goalkeepers